Ward's is an American organization that has covered the automotive industry for over 80 years. 

The organization is responsible for several publications including, Ward's AutoWorld, and Ward's Dealer Business. Ward's also publish the annual list of Ward's 10 Best Engines.

Ward's was acquired by International Thomson Publishing in 1981 and sold to K-III (later Primedia) in 1990. 

Prism Business Media acquired Ward's from Primedia in 2005; Penton merged with Prism in 2006. Penton was acquired by Informa in 2016.

Ward's AutoWorld
Ward's AutoWorld is an automobile trade magazine. It has been published since 1924, originally as Cram Report, and continues into modern times with a monthly print version (Ward's AutoWorld), twice-monthly newsletters (Ward's Automotive Reports and Ward's Engine and Vehicle Technology Update), and subscription website.

References

External links
Official Website

Automotive websites
Magazines established in 1924
Automobile magazines published in the United States
Monthly magazines published in the United States